Are You Being Served? is a British sitcom by Jeremy Lloyd and David Croft which ran on BBC One from 1973 to 1985.

Are You Being Served? may also refer to:

 2016 reboot of the British sitcom
 Are You Being Served? (film), a 1977 film based on the television series
 Are You Being Served? (Australian TV series), an Australian version of the British TV series which ran on Network Ten between 1980 and 1981
 Are You Being Served? Again!, the American and Canadian name for Grace & Favour, a spin-off of Are You Being Served?
 "Are You Being Served?", the title of an episode of the American sitcom Frasier, unrelated to the British series